Attorney General Lucas may refer to:

Isaac Benson Lucas (1867–1940), Attorney General of Ontario
Paul Lucas (politician) (born 1962), Attorney-General of Queensland

See also
General Lucas (disambiguation)